One World Trade Center (also known as One World Trade, One WTC, or Freedom Tower) is the main building of the rebuilt World Trade Center complex in Lower Manhattan, New York City. One WTC is the tallest building in the United States, the tallest building in the Western Hemisphere, and the seventh-tallest in the world. The supertall structure has the same name as the North Tower of the original World Trade Center, which was destroyed in the terrorist attacks of September 11, 2001. The new skyscraper stands on the northwest corner of the  World Trade Center site, on the site of the original 6 World Trade Center. The building is bounded by West Street to the west, Vesey Street to the north, Fulton Street to the south, and Washington Street to the east.

The building's architect is David Childs, whose firm Skidmore, Owings & Merrill (SOM) also designed the Burj Khalifa and the Willis Tower. The construction of below-ground utility relocations, footings, and foundations for the new building began on April 27, 2006. One World Trade Center became the tallest structure in New York City on April 30, 2012, when it surpassed the height of the Empire State Building. The tower's steel structure was topped out on August 30, 2012. Its height in feet is a deliberate reference to the year when the United States Declaration of Independence was signed. The building opened on November 3, 2014; the One World Observatory opened on May 29, 2015.

On March 26, 2009, the Port Authority of New York and New Jersey (PANYNJ) confirmed that the building would be officially known by its legal name of "One World Trade Center", rather than its colloquial name of "Freedom Tower". The building has 94 stories, with the top floor numbered 104.

The new World Trade Center complex will eventually include five high-rise office buildings built along Greenwich Street, as well as the National September 11 Memorial & Museum, located just south of One World Trade Center where the original Twin Towers stood. The construction of the new building is part of an effort to memorialize and rebuild following the destruction of the original World Trade Center complex.

List

Notes

References

External links

 One World Trade Center website

World Trade Center
Lists of companies based in New York (state)
Office buildings completed in 2014
Office buildings in Manhattan
Manhattan-related lists